The 2012 Campeonato Acreano was the 66th season of the Campeonato Acreano, the top professional football league of the state of Acre. Rio Branco were champions for the 28th time.

Teams

First stage

Final stage

Rio Branco and Atlético qualified for 2013 Copa do Brasil

References

Campeonato Acreano seasons
Acreano